Grace Min was the defending champion, having won the event in 2012, but chose not to defend her title.

Petra Rampre won the tournament, defeating Dia Evtimova in the final, 6–0, 6–1.

Seeds

Main draw

Finals

Top half

Bottom half

References 
 Main draw

Audi Melbourne Pro Tennis Classic - Singles